The World Senior Chess Championship is an annual chess tournament established in 1991 by FIDE, the World Chess Federation.

Overview
Originally, the minimum age was 60 years for men, and 50 for women.

Since 2014, the Senior Championship is split in two different age categories, 50+ and 65+, with separate open and women-only tournaments. Participants must reach the age of 50 or 65 years by December 31 of the year of the event.

The championship is organized as an eleven-round Swiss system tournament. It is an open tournament, and each FIDE member federation may send as many players as desired. A separate women's tournament is held only if there are enough participants (at least 10 women from four different FIDE zones).

The winners of the open tournaments (both age categories) are awarded the title of Grandmaster if they do not already have it; winners of the women's tournaments (both age categories) receive the Woman Grandmaster title if they do not already hold it.

So far one World Chess Champion, Vasily Smyslov, has gone on to win the World Senior Championship as well, winning the first such championship aged 70 in 1991. Nona Gaprindashvili is the only Women's World Chess Champion to obtain the women's World Senior title as well.

The oldest World Senior Champion, male or female – before the split in two different age categories was made – was Viktor Korchnoi, who won the title at the age of 75 and a half (in 2006, his only participation).

Vlastimil Jansa then won the 65+ section at the age of 76 in 2018 (his first gold medal), Gaprindashvili won the same year in the women's group 65+ at the age of 77. Julio Ernesto Granda Zuniga of Peru (born in 1967) is the youngest Senior World Chess Champion, section 50+, at the age of 50 in 2017.

For comparison, the oldest reigning World Chess Champion ever was Wilhelm Steinitz, who held the title until the age of 58 years, 10 days. The oldest reigning classical World Chess Champion since the inception of the World Senior Chess championship in 1991 was Viswanathan Anand, who held the title until age 43.

Since 2022 there is a new category, 75+ with open-only tournament.

History
The 8th World Senior Championship was held 9–23 November 1998 in Grieskirchen, Austria.
Vladimir Bagirov (Latvia) won the 200-player men's section on tie-break over Wolfgang Uhlmann (Germany), both with 8.5/11.
Ten players tied a half point behind with 8.0/11, including former World Championship Candidates Mark Taimanov and Borislav Ivkov, the first ever World Junior Chess Champion.
WGM Tamar Khmiadashvili (Georgia) won the 24-player women's section outright with 9.5 points.

The 13th World Senior Championship was held 16–29 November 2003 in Bad Zwischenahn, Germany.
IM Yuri Shabanov (Russia) won the 272-player men's section 9.0/11 on tie-break over GM Jānis Klovāns (Latvia) and IM Vladimir Bukal (Croatia). Khmiadashvili (Georgia) won the 22-player women's section 7.5/9 on tie-break over WGM Marta Litinskaya-Shul (Ukraine).

The 14th World Senior Championship was held 24 October–5 November 2004 in Halle (Saale), Germany. 
IM Yuri Shabanov (Russia) defended his championship, winning the 215-player men's section on a tie-break with five players scoring 8.5/11.
GM Elena Fatalibekova (Russia) won the 19-player women's section outright with 8.0/9.

The 16th World Senior Chess Championship was held 11–23 September 2006 in Arvier, Italy.
Former World Chess Championship challenger and top seed GM Viktor Korchnoi (Switzerland) won the 126-player men's section 9.0/11.
Competing in his first and sole Seniors' Championship, Korchnoi won his first four games, drew in the fifth round with Jānis Klovāns, and then won the next three again. Entering the ninth round with a full point lead, Korchnoi drew his final three games to take the € 3000 gold medal. WGM Ludmila Saunina (Russia), won the 14-player women's section by a full point, 8.5/11, to earn € 700.

Winners 
{| class="sortable wikitable"
! # !! Year !! City !! Open Tournament winner !! Women's Tournament winner
|-
| 1 || 1991 ||  ||  ||  
|-
| 2 || 1992 ||  ||  || 
|-
| 3 || 1993 ||  || || 
|-
| 4 || 1994 ||  ||  || 
|-
| 5 || 1995 ||  || || 
|-
| 6 || 1996 ||  ||  || 
|-
| 7 || 1997 ||  ||  ||  
|-
| 8 || 1998 ||  ||  || 
|-
| 9 || 1999 ||  ||  || 
|-
| 10 || 2000 ||  ||  || 
|-
| 11 || 2001 ||  ||  || 
|-
| 12 || 2002 || ||  || 
|- 
| 13 || 2003 ||  ||  || 
|-
| 14 || 2004 ||  ||  || 
|-
| 15 ||  2005 ||  ||  || 
|-
| 16 || 2006 ||  ||  || 
|-
| 17 || 2007 ||  ||  || 
|-
| 18 || 2008 ||  ||  and  || 
|-
| 19 || 2009 ||  ||  || 
|-
| 20 || 2010 ||  ||  || 
|-
| 21 || 2011 ||  ||  || 
|-
| 22 || 2012 ||  ||  || 
|-
| 23 || 2013 ||   ||  || 
|-
| 24 || 2014 ||   ||  (65+)   (50+) ||  (65+)   (50+)
|-
| 25 || 2015 ||   ||  (65+)   (50+) ||  (65+)   (50+)
|-
| 26 || 2016 ||   ||  (65+)   (50+) ||  (65+)    (50+) 
|-
| 27 || 2017 ||   ||  (65+)   (50+) ||  (65+)   (50+)
|-
| 28 || 2018 ||   || (65+)   (50+) ||  (65+)  (50+)
|-
| 29 || 2019 ||   ||   (65+)   (50+)||  (65+)   (50+)
|-
| 30 || 2022 ||   ||  (75+)   (65+)   (50+)  ||   (65+)   (50+)
|}

See also 
 European Senior Chess Championship
 Asian Senior Chess Championship

References 

 
 
 
 
 
 
 
 Mark Weeks: About World Chess Championship
 Official website of the 18th Senior World Championship (2008)
 FIDE Presidential Board meeting 1st quarter 2009  – containing the decision to declare Kaufman and Suba co-winners.
 Gaprindashvili and Cebalo become World Senior Champions
 Tamar Khmiadashvili and Anatoly Vaisser are World Senior Champions 

Senior
1991 in chess
Recurring events established in 1991
Senior sports competitions